Look into My Eyes may refer to:

 "Look into My Eyes" (Gotham), 2016 television episode

Songs
 "Look into My Eyes" (Bone Thugs-n-Harmony song), 1997
 "Look into My Eyes" (Fayray song), 2004
 "Look into My Eyes" (George Lamond song), 1990
 Look into My Eyes", by Benzino from the 2005 album Arch Nemesis
 "Look Into My Eyes", by Brando, 2020
 "Look Into My Eyes", by Outlandish, 2005
 "Look into My Eyes", by Janelle Monáe from the 2013 album The Electric Lady

See also 
 Look Me in the Eye (disambiguation)